Snow & Voices is an American, Los Angeles-based dream pop band, that was formed by the duo of Lauri Kranz and Jebin Bruni.

The group's first album, the eponymous Snow & Voices, was released in 2005. Snow & Voices' sophomore effort, What the Body Was Made For, was released in July 2008.
They released their third album, Anything That Moves, in May 2010 on Elastic Ruby Records.

Anything That Moves was co-produced by Bruni and Darrell Thorp. It was mixed by Thorpe with one song mixed by Michael Patterson.
It features musical contributions from Joey Waronker, Joshua Grange, Chris Bruce, Jennifer Condos, Blair Sinta, Cedric LeMoyne, Gregory Slay, Jeffrey Cain, Vanessa Freebairn-Smith and Brian MacLeod.

Discography
Snow & Voices (Bird Song Recordings, 2005)
What The Body Was Made For (Elastic Ruby Records, 2008)
Anything That Moves (Elastic Ruby Records, 2010)

External links
 Official Site
 Myspace

Dream pop musical groups
Alternative rock groups from California
Musical groups from Los Angeles